Brad Spencer may refer to:

 Brad Spencer (American football) (born c. 1981), American college football coach
 Brad Spencer (footballer) (born 1996), Scottish footballer